The National School for Ancient Languages and Cultures "Saint Constantine-Cyril the Philosopher", abbreviated in Bulgarian НГДЕК (NGDEK),  is a high school, located in Sofia, Bulgaria.

It was founded in 1977 by Gergina Toncheva, who was the first principal of the school. The school was named after St. Constantine-Cyril "The Philosopher". The challenging curriculum includes Latin, Ancient Greek, Old Bulgarian known also as Old Church Slavonic and Cultural Studies of Antiquity, among others. Educational trips to Greece and Italy in the 9th and 10th grade are highlights of the comprehensive program.

External links
 NGDEK official site
 NGDEK forum

Schools in Sofia
Educational institutions established in 1977